Andreas Matti (born 21 December 1959) is a Swiss stage and film actor starring usually in Swiss German language cinema and television and stage productions.

Biography 
Born in Saanen in Switzerland, Andreas Matti lives in the municipality of Zürich. His most popular role is the character of Rolf Aebersold in the Swiss comedy serial Fascht e Familie in the 1990s, later he was part of the Lüthi und Blanc cast and played in the Swiss television drama Sonjas Rückkehr alongside Melanie Winiger. Andreas Matti made his acting training at the Academy of Arts in Bern und was a regular guest at the Schauspielhaus Zürich and at the Theater am Neumarkt at Neumarkt, Zürich.

Filmography (excerpt) 
 2013: Tapeten
 2013: Dinu - der Schwerkraft entgegen (TV) 
 2006: Sonjas Rückkehr
 2004–2006: Lüthi und Blanc (19 episodes)
 1994–1999: Fascht e Familie (18 episodes)
 1988: Aus allem raus und mitten drin

References

External links 
 

1959 births
Swiss male stage actors
Swiss male film actors
20th-century Swiss male actors
People from the canton of Bern
Swiss male television actors
Living people